The Viggen 23, also called the Albin Viggen,  is a Swedish trailerable sailboat that was designed by Per Brohäll as a cruiser and first built in 1966.

Production
The design was built by Shipyard Karlskrona in Sweden from 1966 to 1971. It then had its rudder and keel modified and was built by Albin Marine from 1971 until 1977. A total of about 1,450 boats were built, but it is now out of production.

Design

The Viggen 23 is a recreational keelboat, built predominantly of fibreglass, with wood trim. It has a masthead sloop rig with aluminum spars, a deck-stepped mast, wire standing rigging and a single set of unswept spreaders. The hull has a spooned raked stem, an angled transom, a skeg-mounted rudder controlled by a tiller and a fixed fin keel. It displaces  and carries  of ballast.

The design has sleeping accommodation for four people, with a double "V"-berth in the bow cabin and two straight settees in the main cabin. The galley is located on the port side at the companionway ladder. The galley is equipped with a two-burner stove. A navigation station is opposite the galley, hidden under the starboard side seat. The head is located under the v-berth fill-in.

Operational history
The boat is supported by an active class club that organizes racing events, the Albin- och Karlskrona Viggenklubben (English: Albin- and Karlskrona Viggen Club).

See also
List of sailing boat types

References

External links

Keelboats
1960s sailboat type designs
Sailing yachts
Trailer sailers
Sailboat type designs by Per Brohäll
Sailboat types built by Albin Marine
Sailboat types built by Shipyard Karlskrona